True Confessions is the third studio album by English group Bananarama. It was released on 14 July 1986 by London Records. The majority of the album was produced by Tony Swain and Steve Jolley (who produced Bananarama's eponymous second album), with the exception of "Venus" and "More Than Physical". The latter, given a garage remix for its single version, was Bananarama's first songwriting collaboration with the Stock Aitken Waterman (SAW) production team. 

The album contains the group's most commercially successful single to date, a cover version of Shocking Blue's 1969 song "Venus", which peaked at number one on the Billboard Hot 100 in the United States. True Confessions reached number 46 on the UK Albums Chart and number 15 on the US Billboard 200, becoming the group's highest-charting album on the latter chart.

The third single, "A Trick of the Night" was written by Jolley and Swain and re-recorded and remixed by SAW for release in the UK. 

In contrast to the two dance-oriented songs produced by SAW, the majority of the songs produced by Jolley and Swain tend towards rock-based, serious-minded pop. The lyrical content addresses overcoming obstacles in relationships ("Ready or Not", "Promised Land") and tackles social issues, such as the anti-drug stance on "Hooked on Love". Two ballads are included: the aforementioned "A Trick of the Night", which is a cautionary ballad about a male friend trying to survive on city streets, and the jazzy, sophisto-pop track "Dance With a Stranger".

Critical reception
Jerry Smith, reviewer of British music newspaper Music Week, wrote a warm and positive review of the album. He wrote: "They're rather good notice how they're always five minutes ahead of high street fashion, so maybe it's their suitability as teen role models that's kept them afloat on a tide of paper thin melodies far so long. Fashionable targets they may be, but their latest hit single says they still know what their public wants."

Track listing

2013 deluxe edition

Personnel
Credits adapted from the liner notes of True Confessions.

Bananarama
 Keren Woodward
 Sara Dallin
 Siobhan Fahey

Additional musicians

 Tony Swain – keyboards 
 Steve Jolley – guitar 
 Keith Thomas – saxophone 
 Matt Aitken – guitar ; keyboards 
 Mike Stock – keyboards 
 Gary Hughes – keyboards 
 A. Linn – drums 
 Andy Stennett – keyboards

Technical

 Tony Swain – production 
 Steve Jolley – production 
 Stock Aitken Waterman – production 
 Richard Lengyel – recording engineering
 Chips – engineering assistance
 Paul Batchelor – engineering assistance
 Tim Young – mastering

Artwork
 Dennis Cockell – tattoos design
 Martin Brading – photography
 Peter Barrett – sleeve design

Charts

Weekly charts

Year-end charts

Certifications

References

1986 albums
Albums produced by Jolley & Swain
Albums produced by Stock Aitken Waterman
Bananarama albums
London Records albums